Essendon Fields is a suburb in Melbourne, Victoria, Australia,  north-west of Melbourne's Central Business District, located within the City of Moonee Valley local government area. Essendon Fields recorded no population at the 2021 census.

Essendon Fields comprises the Essendon Airport and surrounding commercial areas. The suburb was formally gazetted on 14 August 2008 under the Geographic Place Names Act.

On 21 February 2017 just before 9am, a Beechcraft Super King Air on a passenger charter flight bound for King Island, Tasmania crashed into the nearby DFO Essendon shopping centre shortly after takeoff from nearby Essendon Airport. All 5 people aboard the flight were killed. As the shopping centre had not opened yet, only staff were at the centre, all of whom were accounted for. The incident was the worst aviation accident in Victoria for 30 years.

References

External links
Essendon Fields website

Suburbs of Melbourne
Suburbs of the City of Moonee Valley